William Fletcher (16 February 1866 – 1 June 1935) was an English first-class cricketer, who played six matches for Yorkshire County Cricket Club between 1891 and 1892.

Born in Whitkirk, Leeds, Yorkshire, England, Fletcher was a right arm fast bowler, who took nine wickets at 24.66, with a best of four for 45 against the M.C.C.  He scored 100 runs, batting right-handed, with a top score of 31* in the same game, for an average of 12.50.  He also played for the Yorkshire Second XI in 1893.

Fletcher died in Knaresborough, Yorkshire in June 1935.

References

External links
Cricinfo Profile
Cricket Archive Statistics

1866 births
1935 deaths
Yorkshire cricketers
People from Whitkirk
English cricketers